Maria Àngels Garriga i Martin, also known as Àngels Garriga de Mata (1898 San Vicente de Calders, Tarragona - 1967 Barcelona), was a Spanish  educator, teacher and writer. She was the mother of politician and pedagogue Marta Mata, promoter of public and secular schools in the Spanish transition.

Life
She was the daughter of Antoni Garriga i Torrents and Marta Martín Artigas. 
She married Josep Mata i Virgili; they had four children, José, Marta, María and Eulalia. 
She was widowed very young since her husband died in 1934 in a work accident.

She taught in the Normal Studies Association of Catalonia ( 1920 - 1923 ), was municipal teacher in Barcelona from 1923 to 1931m and national teacher of the School Board of the City of Barcelona, after 1931. 
After the end of the civil war and the beginning of the Dictatorship, this organism was dissolved (in  1939 ), and she was removed from her job (then known as "Pedro Vila School Group"). She worked in the "Unitarian School Girls" until 1945, when she became paralyzed.

She retired, and lived from 1946 to 1965, with her daughter Marta Mata, in the estate inherited from her late husband, where she wrote, among other books, Beceroles ( 1965 ), the first book to teach reading in Catalan after the war.

At present, the farmhouse of Cal Mata is the headquarters of the Fundació Àngels Garriga de Mata, where activities for schoolchildren, summer courses for teachers, seminars, conferences, publications related to pedagogy, etc. are organized. It also has a library of more than 23,000 volumes, specializing in the history of Catalan pedagogy and didactic material from the early 20th century to the present day.

Works
L'entremaliada del ramat. illustrations by Maria Rius. Barcelona: La Galera, 1964 (La Galera d'or)
El gran viaje de Gotazul y Gotaverde. illustrations by Enrica Casademont. Barcelona: La Galera, 1971 (La Galera de oro)
Anem a buscar un gos. illustrations by Fina Rifà. Barcelona: La Galera, 1965 (Desplegavela)
Dijous a Vila. illustrations by Pilarín Bayés. Barcelona: La Galera, 1965 (Desplegavela)
Una excursió accidentada. illustrations by Antoni Bassó. Barcelona: La Galera, 1965 (Desplegavela)
Un indicador para Curtó. Iillustrations by Fina Rifà. Barcelona: La Galera, 1968 (Los grumetes de La Galera)
Dotze contalles de l'Àvia de Saifores. illustrations by Cesc, Joan d'Ivori, Fina Rifà, Josep y Raimon Obiols. Barcelona: La Galera, 1998

References

External links

1898 births
1967 deaths